Charterhouse Cave, on the Mendip Hills in Somerset, is the deepest cave in southern England.

History 

Charterhouse Cave was first excavated in 1972.  By 1977 the Sidcot School Speleological Society had reached Bat Chamber, although the first main breakthrough into the system was made in 1982.
Active exploration continues and breakthroughs were made in April 2008 when  of passage big enough to walk through was discovered, and again when the Portal Pool Sump was passed in May 2009 revealing another  of passage. Continued exploration in 2010 and 2011 brought the cave to its current length and depth

Access 

The cave is situated on land owned by Somerset Wildlife Trust. Because of the various well-preserved formations in the cave, the entrance blockhouse is kept locked and access is restricted to those with permits issued by member clubs of the Charterhouse Caving Company.  For the same reason, no novices or cavers aged under 16 are allowed to enter.

Description 

The cave has three large chambers, Midsummer Chamber, The Citadel, and Times Square; The Citadel is almost as large as the chambers in GB Cave and Lamb Leer.

Various parts of the cave contain delicate formations, including Forbidden Passage, Midsummer Chamber, The Citadel, The Grotto of the Singing Stal, and the First and Second Inlets.

Fauna 

There is a hole in the concrete blockhouse over the entrance to the cave to allow the entrance of bats.

The insect life found within the cave is fairly typical of caves on the Mendip Hills, including a number of troglophiles and troglobites such as the freshwater shrimp (niphargus fontanus) and the springtail (onychiurus schoetti).

See also 
 Caves of the Mendip Hills

References

External links 
 
 Picture of the Grotto of the Singing Stal

Caves of the Mendip Hills
Limestone caves
Cheddar, Somerset